Gonzalo Maroni (born 18 March 1999) is an Argentine professional footballer who plays as an attacking midfielder for San Lorenzo, on loan from Boca Juniors.

Club career 
Maroni is a youth exponent from Boca Juniors. On 16 May 2016, he made his first team debut in a league game against Estudiantes.

On 25 June 2019, Maroni joined Serie A side Sampdoria on loan until 30 June 2020 with an option to buy.

Boca Juniors
Argentine Primera División: 2017–18
Copa Argentina: 2019–20
Copa de la Liga Profesional: 2020

Atlas
Liga MX: Apertura 2021, Clausura 2022
Campeón de Campeones: 2022

References

Living people
1999 births
Argentine footballers
Argentine expatriate footballers
Association football midfielders
Footballers from Córdoba, Argentina
Argentina under-20 international footballers
Instituto footballers
Boca Juniors footballers
Talleres de Córdoba footballers
U.C. Sampdoria players
Atlas F.C. footballers
San Lorenzo de Almagro footballers
Argentine Primera División players
Primera Nacional players
Serie A players
Liga MX players
Argentine expatriate sportspeople in Italy
Argentine expatriate sportspeople in Mexico
Expatriate footballers in Italy
Expatriate footballers in Mexico